Dali is a town in Nanhai District, located to the north of the downtown Foshan, Guangdong, People's Republic of China.

Economy
Dali is mainly famous for its aluminium extrusion industry.

Administration
, it administers the following 42 residential neighborhoods:

Liyuan Community
Linan Community
Lixiong Community
Lixing Community
Zhijie Community
Liucun Community
Huaxia Community
Qiyang Community
Jiayi Community
Dongting Community
Jiangbei Community
Libei Community
Lidong Community
Lixi Community
Lizhong Community
Yayao Community
Lianjiao Community
Fengchi Community
Shuitou Community
Qicha Community
Zhongbian Community
Dazhen Community
Xiebian Community
Caobian Community
Taiping Community
Huangqi Community
Liulian Community
Michong Community
Baisha Community
Shaxi Community
Yanbu Community
Hedong Community
Hexi Community
Lian'an Community
Pingdi Community
Hengjiang Community
Dongxiu Community
Yongya Community
Liya Community
Ligui Community
Qicheng Community
Yuye Community

Transportation
The town is situated at the junction of two major highways, the 321 and 325 national highways.

References 

Towns in Guangdong
Nanhai District